Ángel Augusto Buendía Tirado (born 12 May 1951) is a Mexican economist and politician affiliated with the Institutional Revolutionary Party. In 2014, he worked as a deputy in the Legislature of Congress as a multi-member representative.

References

1951 births
Living people
People from Villahermosa
20th-century Mexican economists
Members of the Chamber of Deputies (Mexico)
Institutional Revolutionary Party politicians
Politicians from Tabasco
Deputies of the LIX Legislature of Mexico
21st-century Mexican economists